Maywood Park is a city in Multnomah County, Oregon, United States. The name came from a comment made by the wife of the man who developed the original subdivision, E. F. Taylor, who remarked one winter night how attractive the woods were in May.  An enclave within the city of Portland, the residents of the city voted to incorporate in 1967 in an unsuccessful attempt to stop the construction of Interstate 205.  The population was 752 at the 2010 census.

History
In 1926, Columbia Realty purchased the triangular plot of land on which Maywood Park stands. The parcel was later purchased by Commonwealth Inc., which made plans to create a subdivision modeled after the Laurelhurst and Eastmoreland neighborhoods of Portland. Although the Great Depression delayed development of the land, construction was largely completed by 1943 with about 400 homes. Maywood Park was so large it crossed over where I-205 is today.

In 1967, the residents of Maywood Park voted to incorporate as a city in an attempt to prevent Interstate 205 from cutting through the neighborhood. Although the effort was ultimately unsuccessful, resulting in the loss of 82 homes on the west side, Maywood Park was able to gain noise reduction concessions from the construction of I-205.  Specifically, I-205 is built below grade as it passes by Maywood Park, and a sound wall and green belt provide further noise reduction.

Geography
The city is contained in a trapezoid bordered by NE Prescott Street to the north, NE 102nd Avenue to the east, I-205 to the south, and NE 92nd Avenue (across I-205) to the west, plus the eastern side of 92nd Avenue to Sandy Boulevard.

Demographics

2010 census
As of the census of 2010, there were 752 people, 300 households, and 217 families residing in the city. The racial makeup of the city was 85.5% White, 3.5% African American, 0.4% Native American, 5.9% Asian, 0.1% Pacific Islander, 0.7% from other races, and 4.0% from two or more races. Hispanic or Latino of any race were 4.0% of the population.

There were 300 households, of which 30.3% had children under the age of 18 living with them, 55.7% were married couples living together, 11.7% had a female householder with no husband present, 5.0% had a male householder with no wife present, and 27.7% were non-families. 21.7% of all households were made up of individuals, and 7.6% had someone living alone who was 65 years of age or older. The average household size was 2.51 and the average family size was 2.82.

The median age in the city was 42.8 years. 20.6% of residents were under the age of 18; 5.1% were between the ages of 18 and 24; 28.9% were from 25 to 44; 29.9% were from 45 to 64; and 15.7% were 65 years of age or older. The gender makeup of the city was 47.7% male and 52.3% female.

2000 census
As of the census of 2000, there were 777 people, 306 households, and 224 families residing in the city. The population density was 4,571.4 people per square mile (1,764.7/km). There were 314 housing units at an average density of 1,847.4 per square mile (713.2/km). The racial makeup of the city was 88.42% White, 2.06% African American, 0.90% Native American, 3.99% Asian, 0.13% Pacific Islander, 0.39% from other races, and 4.12% from two or more races. Hispanic or Latino of any race were 2.32% of the population.

There were 306 households, out of which 27.8% had children under the age of 18 living with them, 60.1% were married couples living together, 9.5% had a female householder with no husband present, and 26.5% were non-families. 20.9% of all households were made up of individuals, and 9.5% had someone living alone who was 65 years of age or older. The average household size was 2.54 and the average family size was 2.92.

In the city, the population was spread out, with 20.2% under the age of 18, 6.2% from 18 to 24, 25.7% from 25 to 44, 32.8% from 45 to 64, and 15.1% who were 65 years of age or older. The median age was 44 years. For every 100 females, there were 92.8 males. For every 100 females age 18 and over, there were 90.2 males.

The median income for a household in the city was $56,250, and the median income for a family was $61,750. Males had a median income of $39,821 versus $36,071 for females. The per capita income for the city was $26,472. None of the families and 1.7% of the population were living below the poverty line, including no under eighteens and 1.7% of those over 64.

Government
The city is served by the Parkrose School District and lies within the Mount Hood Community College District.

See also
 Mount Hood Freeway, a freeway revolt related to the development of I-205

References

External links

City of Maywood Park (official website)
Listing for Maywood Park in the Oregon Blue Book

Cities in Oregon
Cities in Multnomah County, Oregon
Enclaves in the United States
Portland metropolitan area
1967 establishments in Oregon